The Church of Our Lady of Navigators is a Roman Catholic Marian church located in the city of Porto Alegre, Brazil. It is one of the most popular Roman Catholic churches in the city and is the focus of one of the largest processions in the city each year on February 2. The current church was built in 1919 and is devoted to Our Lady of Navigators.

The devotion to Our Lady of Navigators started in Porto Alegre in 1869 by Bishop Sebastião Dias Laranjeira who commissioned the sculptor João Afonseca Lapa to build a statue of the Virgin Mary. The statue was first installed in 1871 in another church and was carried in processions.

In 1875 Margarida Teixeira de Paiva donated land for the construction of a church devoted to Our Lady of Navigators and city volunteers built the first church in wood. This first chapel was destroyed by fire, and in 1896 another was erected in the same place, but also caught fire in 1910. Community volunteers again built a new church which was completed in 1912 and formally inaugurated on 23 March 1913, with a new statue of the Blessed Virgin again made by João Afonseca Lapa similar to the one lost in the fire.

The building has been renovated and expanded over the years. It has a Gothic style, with one central tower and two aisles with a series of buttresses, pinnacles and small pillars highlighted abroad. Over the doorway is a bas-relief with the image of the Blessed Virgin Mary saving the shipwrecked.

References

See also
 Roman Catholic Marian churches

Roman Catholic churches in Rio Grande do Sul
Buildings and structures in Porto Alegre
Tourist attractions in Porto Alegre
Roman Catholic churches completed in 1919
20th-century Roman Catholic church buildings in Brazil